Alberto Fernández Sainz (born 15 November 1981 in Barros, Cantabria) is a Spanish former professional cyclist. His father Alberto Fernández Blanco was a professional cyclist from 1978 to 1984.

Major results
2005
 2nd Overall Tour of Galicia
2006
 2nd Overall Vuelta a Tarragona
2007
 1st Bizkaiko Bira
 10th Overall Circuito Montañes
2018
 2nd  Ultra cross-country marathon, European Mountain Bike Championships

References

1981 births
Living people 
Spanish male cyclists
People from the Besaya Valley
Cyclists from Cantabria